The Pilatus PC-12 is a pressurized, single-engined, turboprop aircraft, manufactured by Pilatus Aircraft of Stans, Switzerland, since 1991. It was designed as a high-performance utility aircraft that incorporates a large aft cargo door in addition to the main passenger door. Due to its efficient, high-utility design, the PC-12 is used by a large variety of operators. The main use for the aircraft is corporate transportation, but it is also used by fractional and small regional airlines, air-ambulance operators, and many government agencies, such as police departments and armed forces. The PC-12 has been the best-selling pressurized, single-engined, turbine-powered aircraft in the world for several consecutive years, with 1,800 deliveries made as of April 2021.

Development

In October 1989, Pilatus announced the development of the PC-12 at the annual convention of the National Business Aviation Association (NBAA). Prior to the 1989 announcement, the PC-12 project had been worked on for some time under high levels of secrecy; by the time of the announcement, assembly of the first prototype had already commenced. Pilatus believed that the PC-12 would fit a new market not served by existing aircraft and that the type would be the first single-engined aircraft, with a large cabin, that would be capable of flying at high speeds across long distances. The two prototypes were completed on 1 May 1991, with the first flight taking place on 31 May 1991. Swiss certification of the type had been originally planned for mid-1991, but a redesign of the wings (increase of wingspan and addition of winglets to ensure performance guarantees were met) delayed progress. On 30 March 1994, the Swiss Federal Office of Civil Aviation issued the type certificate for the PC-12; Federal Aviation Administration approval in the U.S. followed on 15 July 1994.

Since entering service, Pilatus developed a large number of improvements and options upon the original PC-12 model; changes include increases in the maximum takeoff weight, the use of increasingly powerful engines, the adoption of new avionics, noise-reduction measures, new propellers, speed and range increases, additional interiors, and new inflight entertainment systems. Other aviation firms, such as Finoff Aviation Products, have also produced their own independent products and aftermarket enhancement packages for the PC-12.

PC-12NG 

Pilatus announced the PC-12NG (Next Generation) at the 2006 NBAA meeting in Orlando and officially launched it during the NBAA 2007 in Atlanta. The NG features a more powerful Pratt & Whitney PT6A-67P engine with better climb performance and an increase in maximum cruise speed to 280 knots true airspeed (TAS). The NG also features a Honeywell Primus Apex glass cockpit; prior to this, the PC-12 had been one of the few high-end models to lack flat-panel avionics. The revised cockpit includes automatic pressurization control, as well as cursor controlled inputs to the navigation system. The PC-12 NG winglets have also been modified from the original version. Within two years of launch, over 200 orders reportedly had been placed for the PC-12 NG. In May 2008, the first PC-12 NG was delivered.

The PC-12M (Multipurpose) is based on the PC-12 NG, but equipped with a more powerful electrical generation system that allows installing additional power-consuming equipment. This enables the PC-12M to perform missions such as flight inspection, air ambulance, aerial photography, and aerial surveillance. An optional utility door accommodates parachute drops of people and cargo. This version is marketed in the United States as the PC-12 Spectre paramilitary special-missions platform.

On 18 December 2012, Pilatus officially opened its Chinese headquarters in Chongqing Liangjiang and announced future manufacturing of the PC-12 for Asia-Pacific customers on the production line at this site. In September 2014, it was announced that the production for various aerostructures for the PC-12 NG would be performed by Tata Aircraft Systems in India from 2016 onwards, these parts having previously been manufactured by PZL-Świdnik in Poland.

PC-12NGX 
At the October 2019 NBAA convention, Pilatus announced the already certified PC-12NGX.
Its PT6E-67XP includes a full-authority digital engine control and a low-speed propeller mode to lower cabin noise.
It reaches a 290 kn TAS (537 km/h) cruise.
Updated Honeywell avionics with autothrottle feature both cursor control device and touchscreen.
Adapted from the PC-24, the cabin windows are 10% larger and the redesigned cabin include new seats.
Scheduled maintenance is extended to 600 flight hours and time between overhaul increases from 4,000 to 5,000 hours.
Deliveries should start in the second quarter of 2020 at a US$4.39 million base price, up to 5.369 million typically equipped as an executive aircraft.
In 2021, its equipped price was $5.443M.

Design

The PC-12 is a single-engined, turboprop-powered, business aircraft, designed for performing multiple roles and to deliver performance and safety equal to twin-engined aircraft. It is powered by a single Pratt & Whitney PT6A-67 engine; early models being powered by the PT6A-67B, while the later PC-12 NG variant uses the more powerful PT6A-67P, which is flat rated at only 70% of its maximum power. According to Pilatus, the PC-12 NG has exceptional versatility and is capable of operating within the most rugged environments, such as the Australian outback; it is one of the few pressurized turbine-powered aircraft capable of operating from rough landing strips. Its trailing arm landing gear allows access to airfields inaccessible to many jet aircraft.

The cabin can accommodate up to nine passengers and has a refreshment centre, an enclosed lavatory, and a rear baggage area. Other cabin configurations include executive arrangements, seating between six and eight passengers; a four-seat passenger-cargo combi layout; and an air ambulance setup housing two litters and three attending medics. The interior was designed in conjunction with BMW's Designworks division, making extensive use of leather, fine wood veneers, and various textiles to create an environment similar to a luxury road vehicle. An atypically large cargo door is installed to accommodate bulky items, including palletised cargo.

The PC-12 incorporates numerous safety measures. The PT6A-67 engine has a reputation for considerable reliability, a factor that has reportedly been decisive to some prospective operators. To counteract stall and spin conditions, dual angle-of-attack sensors near the wingtips force the stick forwards in advance of a potential stall. For greater redundancy, the PC-12 NG has a complete split-bus dual electrical system similar to modern jet aircraft, in addition to two separate batteries and a third emergency battery. The type is certified for flight into known ice conditions; as per standard fit, pneumatic deicing systems are installed in the wings and empennage, while electrical deicing measures are integrated into the windshield, and exhaust heat is used for engine inlet deicing. In 2014, Aviation Week described the PC-12 as possessing "...comparatively slow take-off and landing speeds, excellent short-field performance, and easy handling characteristics."

In addition to its uses as a passenger transport and private aircraft, the PC-12 can be configured as a multimission platform, such as an air ambulance or for conducting surveillance aircraft missions. In the latter role, a retractable electro-optical/infrared sensor may be installed into the aircraft's tail and an operator's console, containing two display monitors, a digital video recorder, communications panel, and expansion bays to accommodate various radios and datalinks, can be fitted in the main cabin area; the aircraft may be highly customized to meet customer's specific mission requirements. In the multimission capacity, the type has seen use by various customers, including the Red Cross, the Royal Flying Doctor Service of Australia, the Royal Canadian Mounted Police, and the United States Air Force.

The type features a three-axis autopilot as standard, while weather radar, long-range navigation systems, and radar altimeter are optional. The flight deck of the PC-12 NG is equipped with Honeywell's Primus Apex avionics system, consisting of four 10-inch, high-resolution, liquid crystal display screens, two of which perform as the primary flight displays directly forward of either pilot, the other two being multifunction displays in a central position between the two pilots. The Apex system shares many similarities to the flight decks of other business jets and has been designed to minimize crew workload and provide for improved safety during single-pilot operations. An advanced synthetic vision system, delivering greater situational awareness and safety during visual flight rules (VFR) flight, is also present. The cockpit's layout is optimized for ergonomic and aesthetic appeal, providing similar comfort levels for the flight crew as to the passengers. An engine-condition monitoring system is present on the PC-12 NG, automatically monitoring engine parameters and producing relevant warnings, easing preventive maintenance efforts.

In October 2021, Blackhawk Aerospace announced plans to offer an “XP67P+” upgrade that will be available for many of the legacy PC-12s. The upgrade will replace the stock Pratt and Whitney PTA-67B engine with a factory-new PTA-67P, allowing higher ITT limits, 142 shaft horsepower gains, and max torque to FL230. All factors that will improve the performance of the aircraft, with 25% better climb rates, higher cruise speeds, and several other operational benefits. Blackhawk announced several deposits for their upgrade at NBAA-BACE 2022, and that baseline flight testing has been completed. STC approval for the FAA should happen second quarter 2023 with EASA certification not long after.

Operational history

Commercial, corporate and private use

Early sales of the PC-12 principally went to utility operators, because Pilatus was reportedly uncertain of the sales potential for business and passenger operators. In 1994, the Royal Flying Doctor Service of Australia became the launch customer of the PC-12. It operates 32 PC-12s throughout Australia to deliver medical services in remote areas.

In 2006,  Flying referred to the PC-12 as "...more economical to operate than any turbine airplane of similar size." In 2007, Flying described the high rate of value retention on used PC-12s as "unbelievable"—attributing this to the popular demand for the type. High oil prices are a prominent factor for increasing sales of turboprops, the PC-12 among them.

The bulk of demand comes from North America, and three-quarters of PC-12NG sales are in executive configurations. While its price grew from $3.3 million in 2005 to $4.7 million in 2015, it retains 80-85% of its selling price after 10 years given average use, better than comparable turboprop or business jets, and it sells 40% faster.

Pilatus also uses a series of overseas distributors to market and sell the PC-12 within designated regions. AMAC Aerospace is the exclusive sales agent for the type within the Middle East.

In August 2014, Californian airline Surf Air placed an order for 15 PC-12 NGs and 50 options, one of the largest contract for the type. PlaneSense, a New Hampshire-based fractional ownership company, manages the largest fleet of the type, operating 34 PC-12s as of 2015.

In June 2010, Pilatus announced that the 1,000th PC-12 had been delivered. By August 2013, the worldwide PC-12 fleet had accumulated a combined total of 4 million flight hours and 1,200 PC-12s had been delivered to customers. Just over a year after the 1300th, the 1400th PC-12 was delivered in July 2016. As of July 2016, the fleet had accumulated 5.6 million total flight hours since certification and 1 million flight hours for the 630 PC-12 NG since its introduction in 2008. In May 2018, with the fleet having logged over 6.8 million hours, the maintenance interval was raised from 100/150 hours to 300 and a new maintenance plan reduced labor by 20% to 40% to lower direct operating costs.

By 2017, a nine-year-old PC-12 was worth $2.5-2.8 million and 15- to 16-year-old models had a $1.8 million value. Owner-operators account for 20% to 30% of the PC-12 sales, while they fly 90% of all SOCATA TBMs.

By October 2019, the PC-12 fleet surpassed 1,700 aircraft, with more than seven million total flight hours.
By May 2021, 1,800 had been delivered including 82 in 2020, having flown eight million hours.

Military operations

The PC-12 is Pilatus' first aircraft directed principally at the civil market. Despite the company historically being a military-oriented supplier, military sales for the type were considered a low priority during the early stages of development.

The U-28A Draco is the United States Air Force variant of the PC-12 for intratheater support of special operations forces performing the role of intelligence, surveillance, and reconnaissance (ISR). The U-28A is operated by the 319th Special Operations Squadron, stationed at Hurlburt Field, Florida, at the headquarters of the Air Force Special Operations Command. The 34th Special Operations Squadron was activated on 9 April 2010 as the second U-28A unit at Hurlburt Field. Both squadrons operate as part of the 1st Special Operations Wing/ 1st Special Operations Group at Hurlburt Field. The U-28A is also operated by the 318th Special Operations Squadron and the 310th Special Operations Squadron as part of the 27th Special Operations Wing at Cannon Air Force Base, New Mexico. In May 2019 the Air Force officially approved the use of the name 'Draco' for the aircraft.

In August 2022, U.S. Special Operations Command announced it had selected the AT-802U Sky Warden for its Armed Overwatch program. The intent is for them to perform ISR and strike missions in uncontested airspace while operating from austere airfields. The Sky Warden will take over combat missions from the U-28A, as it is an aging and expensive aircraft that requires specialized equipment and training to maintain; it will however continue to provide ISR for operations like search and rescue and humanitarian relief after the Sky Warden is delivered.

The Finnish Air Force selected the PC-12 NG in 2009 to replace the service's Piper Chieftains and Valmet Redigos in a liaison role. The aircraft were handed over to the Air Force in 2010. Six PC-12s are in service with the Finnish Air Force.

Variants
PC-12/41
Original production variant certified in Switzerland in 1994, it has a Pratt & Whitney Canada PT6A-67B engine,  maximum takeoff weight, conventional round-dial cockpit.

Certified in 1996, has a Pratt & Whitney Canada PT6A-67B engine, maximum takeoff weight increased to 4,500 kg (9,921 lb). Any of the original production aircraft can be converted to PC-12/45. Sub-variants called Series 1-10, composed of incremental upgrades to the aircraft. Almost all aircraft have been converted to Series 10 specification.

Certified in 2005, has a Pratt & Whitney Canada PT6A-67B engine, maximum takeoff weight increased to 4,740 kg (10,450 lb).

Variant certified in 2008, has upgraded Honeywell avionics and a Pratt & Whitney Canada PT6A-67P engine. Sometimes known by its trade name PC-12 NG (Next Generation).
PC-12NGX
Announced at the October 2019 NBAA convention, marketing name for a PC-12/47E with a PT6E-67XP engine with FADEC and autothrottle, 290 kn TAS (537 km/h) cruise, 10% larger windows, redesigned interior, extended maintenance, updated Honeywell avionics.
PC-12M Spectre
Paramilitary special missions platform marketed in the United States, originally called "Eagle".
U-28A Draco
United States Air Force designation for the PC-12/45.

Operators

, 1,800 PC-12s have been delivered.

Accidents and incidents 
The Aviation Safety Network Wikibase reports 119 accidents and incidents between 3 February 1998 and 24 February 2023. This includes 99 fatalities which gives an average of  fatalities per accident.

Specifications (PC-12NG)

See also

References

Further reading
 Endres, Günter. The Illustrated Directory of Modern Commercial Aircraft. St. Paul, Minnesota: MBI Publishing, 2001. .

External links

 
 
 
 
 
 
 

PC-12
1990s Swiss airliners
1990s Swiss civil utility aircraft
Single-engined tractor aircraft
Low-wing aircraft
T-tail aircraft
Aircraft first flown in 1991
Single-engined turboprop aircraft